Peter Manfredo Jr. (born November 26, 1980) is a former American professional boxer and former IBO middleweight champion. He has challenged twice for upper-level world titles, at middleweight and super middleweight, as well as having won the NABO, IBU and European Boxing Association (EBA) light middleweight titles.

Background
The son of Peter Manfredo Sr., a former professional boxer and world kickboxing champion who holds a third degree black belt in Tae Kwon Do, Manfredo Jr. grew up watching his father train and mentor boxers at the family’s gym in Pawtucket, Rhode Island.

Amateur career
Having started boxing at seven, Manfredo Jr. competed in his first match at nine. He then proceeded to fight in 165 amateur bouts, including a bronze medal-winning performance at the 2000 Eastern Olympic Trials.  Manfredo is the only boxer in New England history to receive the Outstanding Boxer Award at the Junior Olympics, as well as win the title for the Silver Mittens, and the New England Golden Gloves. As an amateur Manfredo defeated future WBC, WBA, IBF Super middleweight champion Carl Froch., but lost several decisions to future undisputed middleweight champion Jermain Taylor in national competitions and even lost a decision in the 2nd round of the 1998 National Golden Gloves to future and fellow Contender finalist Sergio Mora

Professional career
Manfredo Jr. eventually turned professional at the age of 19 and in his debut, he won a four-round decision over Steve Garrett.  Less than two years later, he captured the EBA Light Middleweight Championship with an eighth-round TKO over Mike McFail. He successfully defended his EBA belt two months later, winning a unanimous ten-round decision over Charles Clark. In October 2002, in front of a packed arena of fans at the Dunkin Donuts Center in his hometown of Providence, Manfredo Jr. stepped up in weight class and won a seventh-round TKO over former WBC and WBA Light Welterweight champion Frankie “The Surgeon” Randall. Manfredo Jr.’s nineteenth consecutive victory came at the  Blue Horizon in Philadelphia with a sixth-round TKO over Leonard Townsend. In January 2004, he went on to win the NABO Junior Middleweight title in a sixth-round fight against the previously undefeated Sherwin Davis in an ESPN2 co-feature at Foxwoods Casino.

The Contender
In 2005, he entered reality tv show The Contender, and was placed on the East Coast Team. He was challenged to fight Alfonso Gomez in the first fight, and lost—much to everyone's surprise. But when Jeff Fraza was withdrawn with chickenpox, he was brought back in—by "fate" he said. In his second chance, he beat Miguel Espino in the first round, and went on to face Joey Gilbert in the second round. Here, an accidental headbutt stopped the fight, and Manfredo was given a win on points. He then was re-matched up with Gomez, whom he beat, in the semi-final. 
In the final fight he was defeated by Sergio Mora  in a seven-round unanimous decision, and Mora became the Contender champion. Manfredo fought a second bout against Mora on October 15, 2005 at the Staples Center in Los Angeles, California. Mora defeated Manfredo by a split decision in the rematch. Many ringside observers felt Manfredo won the fight convincingly, but Mora was awarded a controversial split decision.

After The Contender
Manfredo fought Scott Pemberton on February 2, 2006 to a sold out crowd in the Dunkin' Donuts Center in Providence, Rhode Island on ESPN.  It was his first fight at Super Middleweight, as he won by a 3rd-round knockout.  On October 14, 2006 Manfredo defeated Joey Spina with a 3rd-round TKO also at the Dunkin' Donuts Center.

WBO Super Middleweight Title
On April 7, 2007, Manfredo fought Welsh undefeated Super Middleweight Champion Joe Calzaghe in Calzaghe's 20th title defense.  The fight was originally scheduled for March 3, but had to be re-arranged for the later date.  The show, from the Millennium Stadium, Cardiff was aired on HBO in the United States. Manfredo lost the fight when the referee stopped the contest in the third round, with Manfredo appearing unable to reply to Calzaghe's unending barrage of shots. Manfredo claimed his plan was to have Calzaghe (then 34) "run out of gas". Manfredo himself believed that the fight was stopped prematurely.  One month later Manfredo easily defeated Ted Muller in a ninth round stoppage at Twin River Casino in Lincoln Rhode Island.

Manfredo's next fight was June 20, 2007 just one month after his previous victory over Muller, at Foxwoods Hotel and Casino, against tough veteran (14-1) David Banks, who was featured on season 3 of the Contender. Manfredo got the relatively easy decision 97-93 on all the judges' cards.  Manfredo then signed to fight former World Champion Jeff Lacy on December 8 at the MGM Grand Garden Arena, as the final bout on the undercard to the Floyd Mayweather vs Ricky Hatton main event. Manfredo lasted the distance against Lacy, but lost by unanimous decision.

On March 14, 2008, Manfredo  defeated Shane Benfield, then (29-5), at the Twin River Events Center in Lincoln, Rhode Island.  A series of attacks to the body from Manfredo eventually forced a stoppage after 2:30 of the sixth round. May 3, 2008 Peter defeated Luis Lopez by KO in the 3rd round at the Coeur D'Alene Casino Idaho.

On a CES card appropriately billed as “August Annihilation,” Manfredo savagely annihilated Donny  by TKO of round two, on August 22 at the Twin Rivers Events Center  winning the vacant NABF Interim super middleweight belt. The win put Manfredo as one of the top 5 Super Middleweights in the world.

IBO Super Middleweight Title
Manfredo would get an IBO Title shot in his next bout against Sakio Bika on November 13, 2008 at the Dunkin Donut Center. He was knocked out in the third round by the Season 3 winner of the Contender. With the loss, Manfredo dropped to 31-6. Manfredo stated after the fight that it may be his last time in the ring, but he later opted to fight again. He returned, on April 18, 2009 at the Montreal Casino, Montreal, and defeated Canadian super middleweight Walid Smichet by a devastating left hook in the last minute of round 7.

After the fight, Manfredo announced he is moving down to Middleweight, where he was ranked 9th in the World. He planned on fighting John Duddy, but Duddy had suffered his first loss in his last fight. He has stated multiple times, he would like to fight Sergio Mora a third time, this time being in Providence Rhode Island. On June 15, 2009 Manfredo signed a three-fight deal to be promoted exclusively by Chet Koerner's TKO Promotions. In his first fight with TKO Promotions, Peter defeated Ronald Weaver by 1st-round TKO, after Weaver refused to come out of his corner for the second round. The fight was a tune-up fight, fought for charity at the Jonathan Ogden Boxing Classic.

Another IBO Super Middleweight shot
On January 29, 2010, Peter Manfredo defeated St. Paul Minnesota native Matt Vanda by unanimous decision (100-89, 100-89, 99-90) in a 10-round attraction at Mohegan Sun Casino in Ledyard, Connecticut. He knocked down Vanda at the end of round 6. Manfredo was then crowned NABF Middleweight Champion and ranked 12th in the World in the middleweight division.  The fight earned Manfredo a shot at the IBO Middleweight Title, which he won, when he defeated Mexican native Angel Hernandez on May 22, 2010.

WBC Super Middleweight shot
On November 12, 2010,  Manfredo stopped Jhon Berrio for his fifth win in a row. The fight was stopped before the 7th round, when Berrio was unable to continue. On January 14, 2011, he outpointed Daniel Edouard for his sixth win in a row.  Manfredo won a unanimous decision with scores of 97-92 and 98-91 (twice).

In November 2011, Peter Manfredo was stopped by Julio Cesar Chavez Jr in the fifth round of a WBC middleweight title bout. After an entertaining first four rounds "The Pride of Providence" seemed to decide he would go down swinging and engaged Chavez in a brawl. Manfredo got hurt and referee Laurence Cole stepped in at 1:52 to end the fight, allowing Julio Cesar Chavez Jr to retain the title.

Comeback 

In November 2012, Peter Manfredo Jr announced his return to boxing and defeated durable veteran Rayco Saunders in a dominant 10-round decision. Four months later, he beat Contender Season 2 competitor Walter "2 Guns" Wright in a 10-round unanimous decision, Manfredo's 12th contest against Contender castmembers.

In July, after fellow Providence boxer and Contender participant, Gary Balletto, broke his neck at home, Manfredo announced he will take one more return to the ring in November at the Twin River Event Center, against The Contender 4 participant Richard Gingras in honor of Balletto, Manfredo's 13th fight against former Contender series participants, which he won by 8th round tko when the referee waved off the fight after he landed a right uppercut and left hook.

Professional boxing record

|align="center" colspan=8|42 Wins (23 knockouts, 19 decisions), 7 Losses (3 knockouts, 4 by decision), 1 Draw

References

External links 
 Manfredo Jr., The Official Site
 Peter Manfredo Jr. Fight-by-Fight Career Record
 
 Manfredo Gym

|-

|-

|-

1980 births
Sportspeople from Pawtucket, Rhode Island
Living people
American people of Italian descent
The Contender (TV series) participants
International Boxing Organization champions
American male boxers
Middleweight boxers